Walter Estrada (born May 6, 1976 in Canalete) is a Colombian professional boxer and is the former WBA Fedecaribe Featherweight Champion.

Professional career

WBO Featherweight Championship
In his first World title fight Estrada lost to WBO Featherweight Champion, Scott Harrison.

In October 2008, Estrada lost to an undefeated Mikey Garcia.

On November 27, 2010 Estrada would go on to score a huge upset victory over former world champion Nate Campbell. The bout was held on the undercard of Juan Manuel Marquez vs. Michael Katsidis.

Professional boxing record 

|-
| style="text-align:center;" colspan="8"|46 Wins (30 knockouts), 20 Losses (12 knockouts), 1 Draw
|-  style="text-align:center; background:#e3e3e3;"
|  style="border-style:none none solid solid; "|Res.
|  style="border-style:none none solid solid; "|Record
|  style="border-style:none none solid solid; "|Opponent
|  style="border-style:none none solid solid; "|Type
|  style="border-style:none none solid solid; "|RoundTime
|  style="border-style:none none solid solid; "|Date
|  style="border-style:none none solid solid; "|Location
|  style="border-style:none none solid solid; "|Notes
|- align=center
|Loss||46–19-1||align=left| Dennis Ceylan
|
|
|
|align=left|
|align=left|
|- align=center
|Loss||46–18-1||align=left| Matias Rueda
|
|
|
|align=left|
|align=left|
|- align=center
|Loss||46–17-1||align=left| Jezreel Corrales
|
|
|
|align=left|
|align=left|
|- align=center
|Loss||42–16-1||align=left| Eduard Troyanovsky
|
|
|
|align=left|
|align=left|
|- align=center
|Loss||39–15-1||align=left| Jessie Vargas
|
|
|
|align=left|
|align=left|
|- align=center
|Loss||38–14-1||align=left| Vicente Escobedo
|
|
|
|align=left|
|align=left|
|- align=center
|Win||38–13-1||align=left| Nate Campbell
|
|
|
|align=left|
|align=left|
|- align=center
|Draw||35–13-1||align=left| Logan McGuinness
|
|
|
|align=left|
|align=left|
|- align=center
|Loss||35–12||align=left| Luis Ramos, Jr.
|
|
|
|align=left|
|align=left|
|- align=center
|Loss||35–10||align=left| Michael Farenas
|
|
|
|align=left|
|align=left|
|- align=center
|Loss||35–9||align=left| Yuriorkis Gamboa
|
|
|
|align=left|
|align=left|
|- align=center
|Loss||34–8||align=left| Román Martínez
|
|
|
|align=left|
|align=left|
|- align=center
|Loss ||34-7|| align=left| Mikey Garcia
|
|  
|  
|align=left| 
|align=left|
|- align=center
|Loss ||34-6|| align=left| Kevin Mitchell
|
|  
|  
|align=left| 
|align=left|
|- align=center
|Loss ||28-4|| align=left| Vicente Mosquera
|
|  
|  
|align=left| 
|align=left|
|- align=center
|Loss ||26-3|| align=left| Scott Harrison
|
|  
|  
|align=left| 
|align=left|
|- align=center

References

External links

Featherweight boxers
1976 births
Living people
Colombian male boxers
People from Córdoba Department